Ronco was an American company that manufactured and sold a variety of items and devices, most commonly those used in the kitchen. Ron Popeil founded the company in 1964, and infomercials and commercials for the company's products soon became pervasive and memorable, in part thanks to Popeil's personal sales pitches. The names "Ronco" and "Popeil" and the suffix "-O-Matic" (used in many early product names) became icons of American popular culture and were often referred to by comedians introducing fictional gadgets and As-Seen-On-TV parodies.

History
Ron Popeil was inspired to start the company by the open market hustling he saw on Maxwell Street in Chicago during his youth. In the beginning, the company chiefly sold inventions developed by Popeil's father, Samuel "S.J." Popeil. Products include the Veg-O-Matic and the Popeil Pocket Fisherman, a product manufactured by S.J. Popeil's company. During the 1970s, Ron Popeil began developing products on his own to sell through Ronco.

In August 2005, Popeil announced his sale of the company to Fi-Tek VII, a Denver holding company, for $55 million. He was expected to continue working with the company as spokesman and product developer, but sold the company in order to have more time with his family.  Fi-Tek VII changed its name to Ronco, and maintained the right of first refusal for Popeil's future inventions. He continued to develop and market inventions through a successor company, Ron's Enterprises.

Popeil Inventions, Inc. attempted to acquire the trademark on the phrase "set it and forget it," used in the commercials for the Showtime Rotisserie Grill (and "Household goods, namely, rotisseries, electric food dehydrators and structural parts therefor, namely, dehydrator trays and screens") on May 5, 2005, but had abandoned the application by June 5, 2006 The phrase has gone on to be used in popular culture, and has also been used as a trademark in the sale of many other goods.

On June 14, 2007, Ronco filed Chapter 11 in U.S. bankruptcy court. Paperwork filed showed that Ronco creditors, the largest of which was Popeil himself, were owed US$32.7 million.

In 2011, CD3 Holdings, Inc., a consumer products company, acquired Ronco.

On April 27, 2018, Ronco filed for Chapter 11 bankruptcy, seeking time to reorganize after failing to secure funding.

On June 13, 2018, Ronco changed its bankruptcy filing from Chapter 11 (reorganization) to Chapter 7, full liquidation and shutdown.

As of 2022, HD Schulman International Trading, LLC had purchased the rights to the Ronco brand and its portfolio of products, and markets them through the ronco.com website.

Inventions 
Ronco is known for a wide range of products marketed and in some cases invented by Ron Popeil. Among them are:

 Chop-O-Matic: a hand food processor.  "Ladies and gentlemen, I'm going to show you the greatest kitchen appliance ever made ...All your onions chopped to perfection without shedding a single tear."
 Dial-O-Matic: successor to the Veg-O-Matic (and very similar to a mandolin slicer).  "Slice a tomato so thin it only has one side." "When chopping onions with this machine, the only tears you will shed will be tears of joy."
 Popeil Pocket Fisherman: a small fishing pole.   "The biggest fishing invention since the hook ... and still only $19.95!" (according to the program Biography, the original product was the invention of Popeil's father and only marketed by Ronco, but as of 2006, Popeil had introduced a redesigned version of the product)
 Mr. Microphone: a short-range hand-held radio transmitter that would broadcast over an FM radio. The nearby radio(s) would therefore amplify the sound coming from the Mr. Microphone. Though not the first microphone to broadcast over the radio, it was by far the most popular, remaining on the market for over a decade. In the ad, a convertible rolls past with the FM radio turned up; a young man in the car transmits using a Mr. Microphone, "Hey, good-lookin', we'll be back to pick ya up later!" The ad has been subject to numerous parodies over the years. Mr. Microphone is referenced in Police Academy 2, Sabrina: The Teenage Witch in the fourth season finale "The End of an Era" and is parodied extensively in The Simpsons episode "Radio Bart".
 Inside-The-Shell Egg Scrambler: "Gets rid of those slimy egg whites in your scrambled eggs." Popeil has said the inspiration for this product was his lifelong revulsion toward incompletely blended scrambled eggs.
 Six Star 20-Piece Cutlery Set
 Showtime Rotisserie: a small rotisserie oven designed for cooking smaller-sized portions of meat, such as whole chicken and lamb. "Set it, and forget it!"
 Solid Flavor Injector: used to inject solid ingredients into meat or other foods. A similar product, called the Liquid Flavor Injector, allowed for the injecting of liquid ingredients into meat; e.g., lime juice into chicken. This product accompanied the Showtime Rotisserie.
 GLH-9 (Great Looking Hair Formula #9): hair in a spray can
 Drain Buster:
 Smokeless Ashtray: a device which used an integrated fan to draw smoke away from the materials in the ashtray.
 Electric Food Dehydrator: "Instead of giving kids candy, give them apple snacks or banana chips. And it's great if you're a hunter, fisherman, backpacker, or camper. Makes beef jerky for around $3 a pound, and you know what went in it, because you made it yourself!"
 Ronco Popeil Automatic Pasta Maker
 Ronco Rhinestone Stud Setter: "It changes everyday clothing into exciting fashions and you don't have to spend a fortune."
 The Cap Snaffler: bottle opener.  "Snaffles caps off any size jug, bottle, or jar ...and it really, really works."

Awards
 The Ronco Inside-The-Shell Electric Egg Scrambler, from 1978, won 84th place in Mobile Magazine's Top 100 Gadgets of All Time.
 Consumers Digest Award "Best Buy in Rotisserie" Dec. 2010

Records
Ronco, like its rival K-tel, was also a record label, issuing compilation albums created for TV advertising and licensed from major record labels.  In the United Kingdom, its first album was 20 Star Tracks, released in 1972.  It issued three albums that reached No. 1 on the U.K. album charts: the That'll Be the Day soundtrack in 1973, which was removed from the U.K. charts after six consecutive weeks at No. 1, as TV-advertised compilations were banned from the chart; Disco Daze and Disco Nites in 1981; and Raiders of the Pop Charts, released at the end of 1982, topping the chart in 1983.  Its then-novel marketing techniques made it a major force, until the emergence of the Now That's What I Call Music! albums and their imitators, after which Ronco rapidly disappeared from the U.K. album market in 1984, when its parent company went bankrupt.  Many of its U.K. ads in the 1970s and 1980s, whether for its kitchen products or albums, featured the voice of Tommy Vance.

See also

 Food dehydrator
 K-tel

References

Further reading

External links
 

American companies established in 1964
American companies disestablished in 2018
Companies that filed for Chapter 11 bankruptcy in 2018
Companies that have filed for Chapter 7 bankruptcy
Defunct manufacturing companies based in Chicago
Kitchenware brands
Kitchen knife brands
Cooking appliance brands
Pop record labels
Infomercials